The United States women's national under-18 ice hockey team represents the United States at the IIHF World Women's U18 Championships.

World U18 Championship record
The United States has won a medal in every IIHF World Women's U18 Championship they've participated in since 2008, including a record eight gold medals.
2008 — 
2009 — 
2010 — 
2011 — 
2012 — 
2013 — 
2014 — 
2015 — 
2016 — 
2017 — 
2018 — 
2019 — 
2020 — 
2022 — 
2023 —

Current roster
Roster for the 2023 IIHF World Women's U18 Championship.

Head coach: Katie Lachapelle

References

Women's under-18
Women's under-18
Women's national under-18 ice hockey teams
Ice hockey